María Soledad Cisternas Reyes (born November 4, 1959) is a Chilean lawyer and disability rights activist. Cisternas, who became blind while she was in college has worked to increase access for people with disabilities in Chile and at the United Nations (UN). She was on the committee that drafted the Convention on the Rights of Persons with Disabilities and served as the chairperson on the Committee on the Rights of Persons with Disabilities. In 2017, Cisternas was appointed the Special Envoy on Disability and Accessibility for the UN.

Biography 
Cisternas was born on November 4, 1959, in Santiago. Cisternas was diagnosed with retinitis pigmentosa at the age of fourteen. She attended the Pontifical Catholic University of Chile where she studied Legal Sciences and earned a master's degree in Political Science. While she was in college, her vision continued to worsen, but she hid her condition from teachers and classmates. Becoming blind was difficult for Cisternas to accept, but eventually she started working to secure the rights of people with disabilities. Cisternas went on to become a lawyer and disability rights activist.

She created the Legal Disability Program at the Diego Portales University in 2000 and chaired the department until 2008. In 2001, she was part of a team that fought a lawsuit on behalf of the Deaf community to demand the inclusion of sign language and closed captions on television in Chile. Cisternas also created a group called Corporación Pro Ayuda al Débil Visual (COPRADEV) and served as president.

From 2006 to 2008, Cisternas worked on the ad hoc committee that created the Convention on the Rights of Persons with Disabilities. Cisternas served as the chairperson on the Committee on the Rights of Persons with Disabilities. Cisternas was appointed the Special Envoy on Disability and Accessibility by the United Nations Secretary-General, António Guterres in 2017.

References

External links 
 Message from Ms. María Soledad Cisternas Reyes Special Envoy of the SG on Disability & Accessibility (2019 video)

1959 births
People from Santiago
Blind lawyers
Pontifical Catholic University of Chile alumni
Academic staff of Diego Portales University
United Nations officials
Chilean women activists
Chilean women lawyers
Living people
Special Envoys of the Secretary-General of the United Nations